Santiago Aragón Martínez (born 3 April 1968) is a Spanish retired professional footballer who played as a midfielder.

He was a technically evolved player who often assumed playmaker duties, and played mainly for Real Zaragoza, appearing in more than 350 official matches in 11 seasons – ten in La Liga – and winning three major titles.

Club career
Aragón was born in Málaga, Andalusia. A Real Madrid youth graduate, he played one game for the 1988 league champions (a 0–0 away draw against RC Celta de Vigo on 16 April 1988), also appearing in two and a half seasons with the reserve team in Segunda División; barred by Rafael Martín Vázquez first and Gheorghe Hagi afterwards he was loaned successively to RCD Español and CD Logroñés, both in La Liga, where he only featured in 29 matches combined.

After another loan at Real Valladolid, with top flight relegation, Aragón's career was threatened with fading into obscurity until he joined Real Zaragoza, first on loan. He would be the Aragonese side's dictator of play for several seasons (providing for the likes of Juan Esnáider, Miguel Pardeza and Gustavo Poyet), only missing nine games in his first four seasons combined while also scoring 17 goals himself.

Aragón was part of the side that won the 1995 edition of the UEFA Cup Winners' Cup, having conquered the Copa del Rey the previous campaign. After contributing with four goals to Zaragoza's return to the top division in 2003 he retired aged 35, with nearly 500 official appearances to his credit.

In January 2008, Aragón had his first coaching experience, joining former Zaragoza teammate Ander Garitano's coaching staff precisely at the club. After only one week and two matches (one in the cup), the head manager cited personal reasons for leaving his post, and his assistant followed him.

Honours
Real Madrid
La Liga: 1987–88
Supercopa de España: 1990

Zaragoza
Copa del Rey: 1993–94, 2000–01
UEFA Cup Winners' Cup: 1994–95

References

External links

1968 births
Living people
Spanish footballers
Footballers from Málaga
Association football midfielders
La Liga players
Segunda División players
Real Madrid Castilla footballers
Real Madrid CF players
RCD Espanyol footballers
CD Logroñés footballers
Real Valladolid players
Real Zaragoza players
Spain youth international footballers
Spain under-21 international footballers